Laurens van den Acker (born 5 September 1965, Deurne, North Brabant) is a Dutch automobile designer.

Biography

Van den Acker studied at the Delft University of Technology, where he obtained a Master of Engineering at the Faculty of Industrial Design Engineering.

Career
He began his career in 1990 as a designer at Design System srl in Turin, Italy, that worked on the interior of the Bugatti EB110 supercar.

In 1993, he moved to Audi as an Exterior Designer in the Ingolstadt Design Center in Germany, where he met J Mays. In 1996 he followed J Mays to SHR Perceptual Management in Newbury Park as a Senior Designer. Van den Acker joined Ford Motor Company, where J Mays had become vice-president of Design, in 1998. Late, he became chief designer of the 
Brand Imaging Group in Irvine, California. He was involved in designing Ford concepts such as the 427 (with Joe Baker), 021C (with Marc Newson), Concept U, and Ma; in 2003, he eventually became chief designer on Ford Escape in the Dearborn Design Center, Michigan (USA). In 2005, he became chief designer of Strategic Design of Ford.

In May 2006 he replaced Moray Callum as global head of design for Mazda. He was responsible for the Mazda concepts Nagare (Los Angeles 2006), Ryuga (Detroit 2007), and Hakaze (Geneva 2007).

He resigned from Mazda April 2009, and joined Renault on May 15, 2009. In September 2009, he became Senior Vice President of Renault Corporate Design to replace Patrick le Quément. He contributed to the design of Renault Twizy, as well as fourth-generation Renault Clio and the 2013 Renault Captur.

Van den Acker also worked for Volvo, but for very short time.

Design work
 Bugatti vehicles:
 Bugatti Chiron
 Bugatti EB110
 Ford vehicles:
 Ford 24/7 (concept)
 Ford 427 by Joe Baker
 Ford Escape
 Ford GloCar (concept)
 Ford Model U (concept)
 Mercury vehicles:
 Mercury Mariner
 Mazda vehicles:
 Mazda 3 (2009)
 Mazda Hakaze (concept)
 Mazda Kiyora (concept)
 Mazda Nagare (concept)
 Mazda Ryuga (concept)
 Mazda Furai (concept) 
 Renault vehicles:
 Renault Arkana (2019)
 Renault Captur (concept)
 Renault Clio IV (2012)
 Renault DeZir (concept)
 Renault Espace V
 Renault Talisman
 Renault Twizy

Others
Richard Blackburn wrote in an article in Sydney Morning Herald that van den Acker 'still has some of the sketches' of cars 'he penned as a five-year-old, with smoke bellowing from exhausts and cartoon-like lines depicting the wind. He keeps them because they "capture the emotion of motion". In layman's terms that means creating forms and surfaces that look as if they're moving when they're standing still.'

References

External links
Drive.com article
Interview with Laurens van den Acker on design and emotion

1965 births
Living people
Dutch automobile designers
Audi people
Ford designers
Renault people
Volkswagen Group designers
Delft University of Technology alumni
People from Deurne, Netherlands